Frederico Gil and Jaroslav Pospíšil won the first edition of the tournament, defeating Franco Ferreiro and Rubén Ramírez Hidalgo 6–4, 6–4 in the final.

Seeds

Draw

Draw

References
 Main Draw

BVA Open - Doubles